A choral scholar is a student either at a university or private school who receives a scholarship in exchange for singing in the school or university's choir.  This is a common practice in the UK at schools attached to cathedrals where the choir is the cathedral choir, and at Oxford and Cambridge University Colleges, many of which have famous choirs.

The term is also used to refer to those who have taken a gap year to sing for a cathedral choir, generally taking on the same responsibilities as the choir's lay clerks. If the cathedral is linked to a cathedral school, the scholarship may also involve part- or full-time work at that school.

See also 
Choir of Christ Church, Oxford
Choir of Clare College, Cambridge
Choir of Emmanuel College, Cambridge
Choir of Gonville and Caius College, Cambridge
Choir of King's College, Cambridge
Choir of King's College London
Choir of Magdalen College, Oxford
Choir of New College, Oxford
Choir of St John's College, Cambridge
Choir of St Peter's College, Oxford
Choir of Trinity College, Cambridge
Choir of Worcester College, Oxford
Peterhouse Chapel Choir, Cambridge
St Catherine's College Choir, Cambridge
Trinity College Chapel Choir, University of Toronto
University of Exeter Chapel Choir

References 
Collegium Regale – The Choral Scholars of King's College, Cambridge
The Gentlemen of St John's - The Choral Scholars of St John's College, Cambridge
The Choir of St John's College, Cambridge
Choral Scholars of Trinity College, Toronto, Canada
The University of San Diego Choral Scholars
St. Paul’s Choral Scholars
University College Dublin Choral Scholars

Choir schools
University choirs